Panachikkad  is a village in Kottayam district in the state of Kerala, India.

Location
Panachikkad is a small village near Chingavanam, almost 10 km away from Kottayam, famous for its Panachikkadu Temple dedicated to goddess Saraswati. It has thus come to be known as Dakshina-Mookambika (Mookambika of the South).

Demographics
 India census, Panachikkad had a population of 43595 with 21370 males and 22225 females.

References

Villages in Kottayam district